Carolina Veronica Mestrovic Moroni (born July 20, 1991) is a Chilean singer, actress and TV host known for her role in TVN's Rojo fame contrafama, where she won the "singers category" in 2008.

Career 
Mestrovic first appeared on television in 2008 in the Chilean program Rojo fama contrafama (Red, the Value of Talent), where she won in the Singers category and received a car as her reward. She subsequently joined Chilevisión's youth program Yingo, which also showcased her singing talent. In 2010 she competed on Yingo and won second place, collecting a  prize. In December 2010 she participated in Yingo′s "great challenge" as a couple with Jaime Artus, but dropped out on December 22. Mestrovic was part of the second musical album of this program, called Yingo 2, and debuted as an actor with the miniseries Amor Virtual and Don diablo. She participated in the casting for the Latin American version of High School Musical.

On November 25, 2011, Mestrovic left Yingo to join the rival show Una nueva competencia por un Auto (A New Competition for a Car). She also played Linda in the miniseries Gordis and participated in the fifth season of Fiebre de Baile: Famosos en peligro (Dance Fever: Celebrities in Danger). She also went on to lead the backstage of El Rey del Show (King of the Show).

She then left to join the drama channel area to play Sofia in Telefe's TV series Graduotos, which became the most successful television series of 2012 in Argentina.

In addition, she was chosen to handle the backstage of the Viña Festival.

Music 
In 2003, Mestrovic was in a band called "duoYndigo" with Fernando Alvarez and Federico Henriquez.

In 2009, she was part of the second Yingo soundtrack, called Yingo 2. She sang three songs, one a duet with Karen Paola.

Personal life 
Mestrovic's mother, Veronica Moroni, is Argentinian, and her father, Stanislav Mestrovic, is a Chilean national. Mestrovic was born in Arica, Chile but spent her childhood and part of her youth in Mendoza, Argentina. In December 2010 she confirmed that she was pregnant by Mario Velasco, former host of Yingo; their daughter Juliet Velasco was born on July 13, 2011.

Filmography

Television

TV shows

Host

Dramas

Discography 
Songs
 "No me hagas esperar"
 "Juntitos»
 "Así es el amor" (with Karen Paola) (Yingo 2)
 "Vivo en rebeldía" (Yingo 2)
 "Quiero saber" (Yingo 2)
 "Mentiras y egos"
 "No puedo olvidarte"

Awards and nominations

References

External links 
 

1991 births
Living people
21st-century Chilean women singers
Chilean telenovela actresses
People from Arica
Chilean women television presenters